The Court of Chancery of Upper Canada was a court of equity in Upper Canada. It was established in 1837. 

The idea of introducing a court of equity in the province had been around since at least 1801, when Henry Allcock suggested it. On Allcock's model, Peter Hunter—then the province's lieutenant governor—would be the chancellor and a master of the rolls would also be named. Allcock's proposal did not come to fruition: Hunter died and Allcock was named the chief justice of Lower Canada before the new court could be created. Various proposals were floated and also failed between 1801 and 1836.

On March 4, 1837,  the parliament of Upper Canada finally created the Court of Chancery of Upper Canada by the Chancery Act, 1837. The statute provided the court would "have jurisdiction, and possess the like power and authority as by the laws of England are possessed by the Court of Chancery in England, in respect of the matters hereinafter enumerated". Its jurisdiction included claims for alimony, but not divorce.

A commission, comprised in part of James Christie Palmer Esten, William Hume Blake, and Robert Easton Burns, studied the court's operations from 1843 to 1845. Its recommendations, which suggested simplifying the court's procedures, were largely adopted by a statute passed on June 10, 1857.

The court—by then a court of Ontario—was incorporated as a division of a new Supreme Court of Judicature by the Judicature Act, 1881.

Notes

Sources

Further reading 
 Chancery Act, 1837, 7 William IV, c 2

1837 in Upper Canada
Legal history of Canada
Ontario courts